Julian Walker (born September 10, 1986) is a Swiss professional ice hockey forward who is currently playing for HC Lugano of the National League (NL).

Playing career
He was selected 162nd overall by the Minnesota Wild in the 2006 NHL Entry Draft.

International play
Walker competed in the 2013 IIHF World Championship as a member of the Silver medal-winning Switzerland men's national ice hockey team.

Career statistics

Regular season and playoffs

International

References

External links

1986 births
Living people
HC Ambrì-Piotta players
EHC Basel players
SC Bern players
Ice hockey people from Bern
Genève-Servette HC players
SC Langenthal players
HC Lugano players
Minnesota Wild draft picks
EHC Olten players
Swiss ice hockey forwards
HCB Ticino Rockets players